Keang Peng School is a private school in Nossa Senhora de Fátima, Macau, with two campuses, one each for preschool/primary and secondary levels.

References

External links

 Keang Peng School 

Schools in Macau
Macau Peninsula